Fardin Abedidni (born November 18, 1991 in Tabriz, Iran) is an Iranian football defender.

Club career
He played his first match for Esteghlal in 2010–11 season. He then loaned to Tractor and played two seasons there, although he missed his final season due to heavy injury. He returned to Esteghlal before the start of 2013–14 season.

Club Career Statistics
Last Update: 1 August 2013 

 Assist Goals

Honours

Club
Iran's Premier Football League
Runner up: 3
2010–11 with Esteghlal
2011–12 with Tractor
2012–13 with Tractor
2014–15 with Tractor

References

External links
 Fardin Abedini at Persian League
 
 Fardin Abedidni in Iran Pro League

Iranian footballers
Living people
Sportspeople from Tabriz
Esteghlal F.C. players
Tractor S.C. players
Gostaresh Foulad F.C. players
1991 births
Association football fullbacks